Fategarh may refer to the following localities in India:

 Fategarh, Odisha
 Fatehgarh, Uttar Pradesh
 Fatehgarh, Bhiwani, Haryana
 Fatehgarh Churian, Punjab
 Fatehgarh Sahib, Punjab
 Sirhind-Fategarh, Punjab

See also
 Fatehgadh, Gujarat